Gouin or Goüin is a French surname. The surname originates in the province of Brittany; in the Breton Celtic language, pre French or Gallic conquest of the Brittany celts,  "gouin" or "gwin" means "white". Thus, it is a cognate of the Welsh surname Gwyn/Gwinn/Quinn which has the same meaning. It is widespread both in France and Canada (especially in Quebec). The diaresis appears to be an archaism, and is never, or very seldom, used by any of the current living holders of the name. Notable people with the surname include:

 Alexandre Goüin (1792–1872), French banker and politician
 Antoine-Némèse Gouin (1821–1899), lawyer and politician
 Ernest Goüin (1815–1885), French engineer
 Eugène Goüin (1818–1909, French banker and politician
 Félix Gouin (1884–1977), French politician
 Jean Ivan Gouin (1916–2007), Canadian businessman
 Léon Mercier Gouin (1891–1983), Quebec lawyer and politician
 Louis Gouin (1756–1814), Canadian politician
 Lomer Gouin (1861–1929), Quebec politician, former Premier
 Paul Gouin (1898–1976), Quebec politician

French-language surnames